Roswinkel is a village in the Netherlands. It is part of the Emmen municipality in Drenthe, and is located close to the border with Germany.

History 
Roswinkel developed in the 13th century from Weerdinge. It was first mentioned in 1327 as "In marka de Werdighen juxta Roeswinkel", and the name means "enclosed land near reed". It already had a church. In the 15th century, it became a parish. The current church dates from 1759. In 1840, it was home to 561 people.

References 

Populated places in Drenthe
Emmen, Netherlands